Nohur ( Nokhur) is a village in, and seat of Nohur geňeşligi, Baherden District, Ahal Province, Turkmenistan. The area is known for sacred places connected to the Persian legend of the Peri, most notably the Gyz-bibi cave.

Etymology
According to the Government of Turkmenistan, the etymological origin is disputed, with some locals believing it derived from Noah (many places in the region carry Biblical names) and some from the Peri themselves, as "no" and "hur" can be translated as "nine peri". Soltanşa Atanyýazow noted in his dictionary of Turkmen place names,Nohur is an ethnic name. The local elders interpret the meaning of the word in two ways as "the place of the nine beauties" (in Persian no is "nine" and huri is "beautiful girl") and "the place of Noah's son Nohur". In Persian, the word nohur is a plural of the word nahr, meaning "throats". Another source asserts that the name is derived from two Persian words meaning "ten donkeys", alluding to the putative arrival of the village's original settlers on donkeys.

Administration
Nohur area consists primarily of Upper Nohur (Garawul and Kone-Gummez villages) and Lower Nohur (Old Nohur village). Upper Nohur includes the Ýeňiş Farmers’ Association, which incorporates two villages. The cultivated area totals 15,500 hectares.

People 
Far away from Turkmen mainland, Soviet modernization hardly penetrated into the village and traditional lifestyle flows unabated among the local tribe—Nohurli. They consider themselves to be descendants of the legionnaires of Alexander the Great — a stone is said to preserve the footprint of Alexander's horse.

Language 
Nohur, a Turkmen dialect is spoken.

Tourism 
Nohur remains a popular destination for trekkers — the Chandybil Tourist Center is located halfway between Lower Nahur and Garawul.

A graveyard with headstones decorated with the horns of rams is peculiar to Nokhur. Just beyond, lies a cave-shrine dedicated to Kyz Bibi. About  from the Center, is the Khur-Khuri Waterfall flowing into a tree-filled gorge.

Gallery

References

Populated places in Ahal Region